John Morrison is an Australian jazz drummer, band leader, educator, and commercial pilot. While he is not as famous as his younger brother, trumpeter James Morrison, he is a significant musician in his own right. Voted as one of Australia's best big band drummers, his band Swing City was selected to open the Sydney 2000 Olympics. Throughout his career Morrison and his groups have headlined every major event and festival in Australia.

Music career
As the eldest of the family, Morrison spent much of his musical life playing and recording with his younger brother, James. At age 8, he began playing cornet in the school brass band. By the age of 10, he had built his first drum set from pots and pans.

Morrison has played with Bob Barnard, Bobby Gebert, Christian McBride, Don Burrows, Eartha Kitt, Garry Dial, George Golla, James Moody, Jimmy Witherspoon, John Clayton, Jeff Clayton, Richie Cole, and Scott Hamilton.

Morrison leads the big band Swing City, who together with his brother James Morrison played the prerecorded fanfare at the opening of the Sydney 2000 Olympic Games and more than twelve years later remains a top act. In addition to two successful albums, Morrison and his wife, singer Jacki Cooper, and have toured China, where they performed and recorded with the Shanghai Symphony Orchestra. Morrison produced the albums Elly Holyt and Mothership. Both won Australian Jazz Bell Awards.

Working with kids
Morrison has acted as mentor for youth bands and orchestras. For over 38 years he has been musical director for the Sydney Jazz Camps. Morrison and his wife spend time each year touring disadvantaged schools throughout the Northern Territory, inspiring kids to get involved in music. He has seeded bands in the remotest parts of the Cape York Peninsula for the Queensland Music Festival, giving young indigenous Australians the opportunity to try jazz.

In 2013 Morrison launched the Big Band Blast Festival in Port Macquarie (NSW Australia). The festival invites musicians of all ages to celebrate the sound of the big band in a non-competitive environment. Morrison is an outspoken opponent of competitive playing and believes music should be a collaborative, not competitive.

Morrison has gained nearly 6000 flying hours in more than fifty different aircraft as a professional pilot.

See also
 The Games of the XXVII Olympiad 2000: Music from the Opening Ceremony

External links
 Swing City website
 Biography
 Big Band Blast

Year of birth missing (living people)
Living people
Australian bandleaders
Australian jazz drummers
Male drummers
Australian music educators
People from New South Wales
Commercial aviators
Male jazz musicians